Skolos may refer to:
Skolos (Boeotia), a town of ancient Boeotia
Skolos (Chalcidice), a town of ancient Chalcidice
Nancy Skolos (born 1955), American graphic designer